This is a list of named craters on Callisto, one of the many moons of Jupiter, the most heavily cratered natural satellite in the Solar System (for other features, see list of geological features on Callisto).

As of 2020, the Working Group for Planetary System Nomenclature has officially named a total of 142 craters on Callisto, more than on any other non-planetary object such as Ganymede (131), Rhea (128), Vesta (90), Ceres (90), Dione (73), Iapetus (58), Enceladus (53), Tethys (50) and Europa (41). Although some Callistoan craters refer to the nymph Callisto from Greek mythology, they are officially named after characters from myths and folktales of cultures of the Far North.

List of Craters 

back to top

See also 
 List of craters on the Moon
 List of craters on Mars
 List of craters on Mercury
 List of craters on Venus

Note

References

External links 
 USGS: Callisto nomenclature
 USGS: Callisto Nomenclature: Craters
 Callisto Crater Database Lunar and Planetary Institute

Callisto

Impact craters on Jupiter's moons